Rachel Ankomah (born 28 December 1993) is the founder of Accra Majestics Rugby League Club which is based in Accra. She is also a Ghanaian rugby league enthusiast, content creator and an advocate for women in sports. She was the first women's rugby league coordinator in Ghana and a pioneer  for the sport in Ghana.

Early life and education 
Ankomah is an alumna of Achimota Senior High School and University of Ghana, Legon. She started sports at a very young age. Her first competitive sport was triple jump in Junior High School.

She continued with the sport in Senior High School while proceeding with participating in soccer, hockey, basketball, handball, cricket and javelin. She was a member of the team that represented Achimota School in the games in Nigeria in 2011 and 2013. She became the captain of the Achimota Hockey School Team in 2012.

In university, she was part of the team that represented University of Ghana at the GUSA games in 2014 and 2016, taking the first position and second position respectively in the hockey competitions.

In 2016, she became the team manager for Warriors Volleyball club. In 2017, she became the team manager for Titans Sporting Club- Rugby.

Career 
She joined First Insurance Company Ltd in 2017 as a National Service Personnel and in 2019 as an Assistant Executive Officer.

In 2019, she became the team manager for Ghana Skolars Rugby League Club. She helped the team take the second position in the Ghana Rugby League Championship that same year. She was also selected as the best team manager in February 2020. Her team also won the February edition of the Ghana 9's series.

Ankomah became the women's coordinator for Rugby League Federation Ghana in June 2020. She was in charge of the development of the women's division. She launched a campaign called Pretty Girls Play Rugby League in 2020. The aim was to challenge the stereotyping of women in sports, especially those in rugby league.

Ankomah was then selected to be part of the Middle East and Africa Women's Working Group. This group was in charge of the development of women's rugby league in the Middle East and Africa regions.

She was also selected to represent the group at the International Rugby League Women and Girls Advisory group. She helped her club gain a partnership deal with Athen Raiders Rugby League Club in Greece.

Ankomah resigned from her post as the team manager for Ghana Skolars Rugby League Club and her position as women's coordinator in February  2021 and March 2021 respectively. In 2021, she started her own project called Rachel Ankomah RL where she interviews Rugby League personalities, creates Rugby League contents and also educate and promote the sport in her own way.

On 10 July 2021, she launched her club known as Accra Majestics Rugby League Club which is a partner of Bastos Majestics based in Cameroon. In less than a month, her club became affiliates of Srama Rugby League Recruitment. This made her the first woman to own a rugby league club in Ghana.

Currently, she works as a Sports Development Officer for the National Sports Authority and also as the Municipal Sports Director of the Krowor Municipal Assembly.

Flexi Africa also named her as an influencer for their company in 2022.

Rachel recently rebranded Rachel Ankomah RL to Rachel Ankomah Media, an online media platform that publishes sports news and articles with prime focus on Lesser known sports in Ghana.

Projects 
 Pretty Girls Play Rugby League Campaign
 Launching of five women teams
 WeEmpower Campaign
 Breast Cancer Awareness Program
 Breaking the Bias Program
 Kids Play Rugby League Too

Achievements and awards 
 Winner of the Youth Sports Personality of the Year 21 Awards
 First female founder of a Rugby League club in Ghana
 First women's rugby league coordinator
 Recognized as a rugby league hero by the International Rugby League in 2020
 Nominated as a member of the MEA WWG
 Selected as a representative of the MEA WWG at the IRL WGAG.
 Selected as the best team manager in February 2020
 Captain of the Achimota Hockey team in 2012.
 First team Manager for Ghana Skolars Rugby League Club.
 Featured in a special episode on Chasing Kangaroo podcast (Chasing Jillaroos)
 Featured in an interview by Rodney Hinds (The Voice Online)
 Featured in an interview by Change in Africa Magazine
 Selected to join the match review panel for the RLFG

References

General references 
 
 
 

Living people
Alumni of Achimota School
People from Accra
Rugby league chairmen and investors
University of Ghana alumni
Founders
1993 births